Tauba Tauba is a 2004 Indian Hindi-language sex comedy film written and directed by T L V Prasad, starring Payal Rohatgi, Antara Biswas, and Amin Gazi . It was directed by T L V Prasad and is a remake of the 1981 American film Private Lessons which starred Sylvia Kristel. It was followed by a sequel in 2008, Phir Tauba Tauba which was also directed by Prasad.

Tauba Tauba, is a low budget film, tells the tale of 15-year-old Sunny (Amin Gazi), a motherless child of a business tycoon, Mohan Shanbagh (Ayub Khan). Sunny is a sex addict, this is partially due to Sunny's environment. His school principal Mr. Gomes (Laxmikant Berde) who is also a sex addict like him, goes around bedding all the teachers and at home his Casanova Father is involved in love games with secretary Sophia (Rashi Tyagi), who from time to time also teases Sunny with her sexuality. All these factors expose Sunny to sex at his young age, so when Sunny sees 25-year-old Payal (Payal Rohatgi), it's not long before he is smitten.

Plot
Sunny, a 15 a-year old boy is at school, singing with his friends and generally making an ass of himself. when he goes for his winter vacation to his house in Pune. There we are introduced to Rocky, his multimillionaire father's manager who owes Rs 1 million to "Sultan bhai" of Multan. When his father who himself is no slouch when it comes to chasing skirts goes to London on some business, he leaves his son some blank cheques in case there is an emergency. Rocky needs money, not only to pay off the debt, but also to make a movie with his model girlfriend Rubina. Payal also needs money to pay for her boyfriend's medical expenses.

Rocky promises to pay her the money if she can trap his boss' son. Payal then moves into Sunny's neighbourhood to seduce him. Sunny, is treated to watch Payal in bikini, in a very revealing dress soaping her car, in bubbles luxuriating in her bathtub and in other such enlightening poses. Soon, the two get introduced and Sunny gets the opportunity to rub her back and later, get her in the sack (later, Payal informs Sunny that they didn't have sex; he was just too drunk to remember anything. That way everyone's chastity is maintained). After having 'sex' with him Payal plays dead. A panicky Sunny goes to Rocky and tells him what happened. Rocky then goes to the lovely neighbour's house, wraps a dummy in a sheet and tells Sunny to bury it. He also deftly clicks some snaps of Sunny burying the 'body'.

Soon Sunny gets a courier from a blackmailer threatening to expose him if he doesn't cough up Rs 10 million. Sunny has no option but to use his father's blank cheques. But somewhere down the line, Payal gets guilt pangs and tells Sunny the truth. The rest of the movie is then about Sunny and Payal who wants to do pashchatap and recovering the money from Rocky.

Cast

Payal Rohatgi as Payal
Antara Biswas as Rubina
Amin Gazi as Sunny
Laxmikant Berde as Mr. Gomes
Ayub Khan as Mohan Shanbagh
Rashi Tyagi as Sophia 
Rocky Sandhu
 Supriya Karnik
Tej Sapru
Anil Nagrath
Sumeet Arora
Rashid Khan
 Kishore Bhanushali
Shyam Solanki
 Vikas Kalantari as himself (cameo appearance)
 Sweta Keswani as herself (cameo appearance)
Arun Daga as himself (cameo appearance)

Music

The film score is composed by various artists such as Nitin Raikwar, Vikrant Mathur, and Vishuraj-Jayant.

Release

The film was released on 1 October 2004 in India with 190 screens counts and worldwide.

Reception

Critical response

The film was panned by critics upon release. Salil Kumar reviewing for Rediff, gave the film a negative review and said, '...it is doubtful if anyone would like to spend Rs 100 just to see a couple of women prancing around in colourful undies'. Guest reviewer for the BBC, Goher Iqbal Punn, also disliked the film and called it film avoidable fare and an ordinary piece of work. Nitika Desai of ApunkaChoice gave the film 3/5 stars and praised the story for balancing sexual exposure with comedy and thriller in the first and second halves respectively, but blamed the lack of substance in the story. It was however noted that those expecting to see cleavage and bikini clad babes will not be disappointed. Kashif Ali of Full Hyderabad gave the film a rating of 3.0 and called it perverse suffering. Pankaj Shukla of Smashhits.com gave the film a negative review but praised Payal Rohatgi calling her a winner as both a sex bomb and an actress. Santabanta.com called the film - Eminently distasteful and not the least erotic or even titillating, 'Tauba Tauba' makes a mockery of the audience.

References

External links
 

2000s Hindi-language films
2000s sex comedy films
Indian sex comedy films
Indian remakes of American films